Father Knows Nothing may refer to:
 "Father Knows Nothing (Three's A Crowd)", an episode of Three's a Crowd
 "Father Knows Nothing", an episode of The Good Guys (1968 TV series)
 Father Knows Nothing, a working title of The Parent 'Hood

See also
Father Knows Best (disambiguation)